Nightlife is a human social activity.

Nightlife or Night Life or Nite Life may also refer to:

Games 
 Nightlife (role-playing game), a splatterpunk game
 Night Life (video game), the first adult game released in Japan
 The Sims 2: Nightlife, the second expansion pack for the video game The Sims 2

Literature 
 Nightlife (novel), a fantasy novel by Rob Thurman
 Nightlife, a novel by Thomas Perry
 Nightlife.ca, a Canadian bilingual lifestyle magazine

Music 
 Nightlife (quartet), an American barbershop group

Albums 
 Night Life (Billy Butler album), and the title song
 Nightlife (Cobra Verde album)
 Nightlife (Erase Errata album), and the title song
 Night Life (Jimi Hendrix album)
 Nightlife (Karl Wolf album), and the title song
 Night Life (Maxine Nightingale album)
 Night Life (Outsidaz album), and the title song
 Nightlife (Pet Shop Boys album)
 Night Life (Ray Price album)
 Nightlife (Thin Lizzy album), and the title song

Extended plays 
 Nightlife (EP), a 2011 EP by Phantogram

Songs 
 "Night Life" (Willie Nelson song), 1960
 "Nightlife" (song), by IAMX
 "Nightlife", by Aretha Franklin from Aretha Arrives
 "Night Life", by Bobby Vinton from Bobby Vinton Sings for Lonely Nights
 "Night Life", by Foreigner from 4
 "Nightlife", by Green Day from ¡Dos!
 "Nightlife", by Kenickie from At the Club
 "Nightlife", by John Foxx from The Pleasures of Electricity
 "Nightlife", by Scissor Sisters from Night Work
 "Night Life", by The Miracles from City of Angels
 "Night Life", by Zion I from Chapter 4

Other media 
 Nightlife, a painting by Archibald Motley, Jr
 Night Life (1927 film), a silent American drama film
 Night Life (1989 film), an American zombie film
 Nightlife (radio program), an Australian late-night talkback radio show
 Nightlife (talk show), a 1986–1987 syndicated American late-night television talk show starring David Brenner
 The Nite Life, an Australian Christian pop radio program

Other uses 
 NightLife, a regularly scheduled event at the California Academy of Sciences